The Bastards' Fig Tree is a 2017 Spanish comedy-drama film directed by  which stars Karra Elejalde, with Carlos Areces, Pepa Aniorte, Mikel Losada, and Jordi Sánchez in supporting roles.

Plot 
The plot starts in 1939, in the last rales of the War of Spain. Rogelio, a "trigger-happy" fascist, gives a second thought to his ways upon witnessing the hateful gaze of a boy whose parents have been killed by Rogelio. Rogelio thus becomes an anchorite, deciding to take care of the fig tree the boy has planted on their parents' tomb.

Cast

Production 
An adaptation of the novel La higuera by Ramiro Pinilla the screenplay was penned by Ana Murugarren. The film is a Blogmedia production.

Release 
The film premiered at the Vlissingen-based Film by the Sea festival on 14 September 2017. Distributed by Festival Films, it was theatrically released in Spain on 24 November 2017.

Reception 
Quim Casas of El Periódico de Catalunya rated the film 1 out of 5 stars, writing that Elejalde Karra Elejalde does not know what to do with his character, whilst the same applies to Areces or Sánchez, "actors gifted for comedy but not for so much nonsense".

Noel Murray of Los Angeles Times wrote that, "thin plot" and "distractingly jaunty score" notwithstanding, the film remains for the most part "a thought-provoking historical fairy tale about the values — and grudges — that survive whomever's  in power".

Nuria Vidal of Fotogramas rated the film 3 out of 5 stars, deeming it to be "a film that moves between esperpento, black comedy and magical realism", citing the meetings between Elejalde's and Areces' characters as the best thing about the film, while lamenting some "inevitable clichés".

Javier Cazallas of HobbyConsolas rated the film with 78 points ("good") praising the evolution of Rogelio's character both from a personal and a physical standpoint, and the "good characterization of the different characters", while writing that the "story seems to be a bit lacking when it comes to an end" as a negative point.

Sergio F. Pinilla of Cinemanía rated the film 3 out of 5 stars, pointing out that despite being short of the excellence of contiguous films such as or Black Bread or Pan's Labyrinth, the film features both Elejalde and Areces in a state of grace.

See also 
 List of Spanish films of 2017

References 

Spanish comedy-drama films
2017 comedy-drama films
2010s Spanish films
2010s Spanish-language films
Films shot in the Basque Country (autonomous community)
Films set in 1939
Films set in Spain
Films based on Spanish novels
Films about fascists